Zharman is a salt lake in Naurzum District, Kostanay Region, Kazakhstan.

Zharman is part of the main lake group of the Naurzum Nature Reserve, a  protected area established in 2009. Now abandoned Naurzum village is located near the southern lakeshore.

Geography
Zharman is a shallow saline steppe lake. It lies at the bottom of a vast depression of the Turgay Basin, between lakes Sarymoin and Zharkol to the north, and Aksuat to the south. The coastline is very indented, with multitude of bays and peninsulas. Shores are sandy and the bottom is muddy. Meadows near the shore are a seasonal grazing ground for local cattle. 

The lake is fed by spring snows and rainwater. In the summer it breaks up into a cluster of separate lakes, and in years of drought Zharman may dry up.

Flora and fauna
Typha and Phragmites reeds grow on the northern lakeshore. Fescue, gorse, wormwood, sedges and tall grasses cover the floodplain of the lake. Zharman is a stopover of bird migratory routes, with species such as swans, cranes, flamingos, geese and ducks finding a temporary habitat in the lake during their yearly migration. Among the fish species in the lake, the most abundant are the crucian carp and the perch.

See also
Central Asian Flyway
List of lakes of Kazakhstan

References

External links
Naurzum nature reserve in Kazakhstan.
Атлас ключевых территорий для стерха и других околоводных птиц Западной и Центральной Азии

Lakes of Kazakhstan
Endorheic lakes of Asia
Kostanay Region